Darrell Etienne (born 11 August 1974) is a Haitian former professional footballer who played as a defender for the Haiti national team.

Career
Etienne played several years in the USL for the Richmond Kickers and Long Island Rough Riders.
In 1999, Darrell was selected to the A-League All-Star Team. With the Roughriders, he helped the team to a D-3 Pro League National Championship. He scored his first goal with the club on 25 June 2003 in a 2-1 loss to Mid Michigan Bucks in a U.S. Open Cup match.

With the Haitian National Team, he appeared in various competitions, including the Gold Cup, Caribbean Cup,  and World Cup Qualifying.

Personal
He is the brother of Derrick Etienne Sr. and uncle of Derrick Etienne.

Statistics

Honors

Club
Long Island Rough Riders
2002 USISL D-3 Pro League

References

External links

soccerstats.us

1974 births
Living people
Haitian footballers
Association football defenders
Haiti international footballers
Twin sportspeople
Haitian twins
Richmond Kickers players
Long Island Rough Riders players
Virginia Commonwealth University alumni
VCU Rams men's soccer players
Expatriate soccer players in the United States
People from Cap-Haïtien